A Game of Chance is a 1920 sporting novel by Arthur Wright, about sensational events in the world of Australian horse racing.

Reception
According to the reviewer in the Western Mail:
Hero and heroine and villain of the piece are well enough drawn; and there is incident enough in the book to satisfy the veriest glutton for sensation; while towards the close of an exciting story the murder trial... finishes in a most unexpected manner. Mr. Arthur Wright has been compared with the late Nat Gould; and as a rule, his books contain even greater dramatic, or melodramatic, possibilities, or impossibilities, than the numerous works of that most prolific writer.

References

External links
Copy of complete novel at Internet Archive
A Game of Chance at AustLit
A Game of Chance at National Archives of Australia
Serialisation of story in The World's News in 1919 - 22 March, 29 March, 5 April, 12 April, 19 April, 26 April, 3 May, 10 May, 17 May, 24 May, 31 May, 7 June, 14 June, 21 June, 28 June, 5 July

1920 Australian novels
Australian sports novels
Horse racing novels
Novels set in Australia